Julio García Fernández de los Ríos (31 December 1894 in Reinosa, Cantabria – 29 July 1969 in Madrid) was a Spanish horse rider. He competed in the 1928 Summer Olympics.

García won the gold medal as part of the Spanish team in the team jumping with his horse Revistade after finishing twelfth in the individual jumping, being the first Cantabrian medallist ever.

He was president and president of honor of the Spanish Equestrian Federation.

References

1894 births
1969 deaths
People from Reinosa
Sportspeople from Cantabria
Spanish male equestrians
Spanish show jumping riders
Equestrians at the 1928 Summer Olympics
Olympic equestrians of Spain
Olympic gold medalists for Spain
Olympic medalists in equestrian
Medalists at the 1928 Summer Olympics